Roy Donahue "Don" Peebles (born March 2, 1960) is an American real estate entrepreneur, author, and political activist. Peebles is the founder, chairman and Chief Executive Officer of the Peebles Corporation, a real estate company.

In April 2015, Black Enterprise named Peebles as one of the "Business Trailblazers and Titans of Black America: 40 most powerful African Americans in business". In May 2009, Forbes listed Peebles in the top ten of the wealthiest black Americans, and in January 2015 it estimated his net worth to be over $700 million.

Background 
Peebles was born in Washington, D.C. to Ruth Yvonne Willoughby and Roy Donahue Peebles Sr. His grandfather was a doorman at the Washington Marriott Wardman Park Hotel in Washington D.C. Peebles has said that assisting his father as a car mechanic while still a child contributed to his strong work ethic. At the age of eight, Peebles moved to Detroit, where he spent five years before returning to Washington D.C. at 13 and completed high school while serving as a Congressional Page.

Career 
In 1979, after his freshman year as a student at Rutgers University Peebles dropped out and became a real estate sales agent and appraiser in Washington, D.C. On January 9, 1983, at the age of 23, he established RDP Corporation, a residential and commercial real estate appraisal firm. Later that year, he was appointed to Washington's Board of Equalization and Review by Marion Barry, the real estate tax appeals board currently known as the Board of Real Property Assessments and Appeals. One year later, when Peebles was 24, Washington's Mayor Marion Barry appointed him Chairperson of the Board where he served until 1988. In 1986, a Peebles-led partnership acquired the site for his first real estate development project: a  Class-A office building at 2100 Martin Luther King Ave. SE. In 1990, Peebles founded RDP Assessment Appeals Services, a Washington-based commercial tax assessment appeals firm. Peebles continued to acquire commercial buildings and development sites in Washington, D.C. throughout the 1990s, including 10 G Street NE, and the Convention Center Courtyard by Marriott. In 1996, Peebles redeveloped the 1930s Royal Palm hotel in Miami Beach. The Royal Palm Resort became the nation's first major hotel developed and owned by an African American. Other Miami projects include The Residences at The Bath Club, a luxury residential tower. Peebles also co-developed The Lincoln, a mixed-use development featuring Class A office space in South Beach. In the early 2000s Peebles expanded into San Francisco, Las Vegas and New York.

Peebles had been a member of the Real Estate Board of New York's Board of Governors, the former Chairman of the Greater Miami Convention and Visitors Bureau, an invitee to then-President-elect Clinton's 1992 Economic Summit in Arkansas, and in 2013 was named to Miami-Dade County Mayor Carlos A. Gimenez's Mayoral Business Roundtable.

Developments 

Peebles developed properties in Miami; Miami Beach; Washington, D.C.; and has pending developments in process in Boston, MA (Back Bay, Viola), Charlotte, N.C. (Brooklyn Village), and Los Angeles, CA (Angel's Landing).

Washington D.C. Government Overbilling Lawsuit

In November 2010, D.C. Attorney General Peter Nickles sued Peebles’ company for alleged overbilling; Peebles maintained the charges were politically motivated due to his opposition to then Mayor Adrian Fenty failed re-election bid earlier that year. A D.C. Superior Court dismissed most of the claims against Peebles. The suit was settled in November 2012 by Nickles’ successor, D.C. Attorney General Irvin Nathan for $120,000, a fraction of the initial claim. The court accepted the settlement, and dismissed as moot the over-billing claims.

Peebles present development projects include: 108 Leonard Street (a.k.a. 346 Broadway), a luxury hotel and condominiums in Manhattan's landmarked “Clocktower Building;” in a joint venture with El-Ad Group.,, Angel's Landing, in Los Angeles, and Brooklyn Village, in Charlotte, North Carolina. Only 108 Leonard has begun construction.

1801 Vine Street, Pennsylvania (cancelled by PIDC)

Peebles's contract at 1801 Vine Street, a luxury boutique hotel in Philadelphia's historic Family Court Building was cancelled in November 2020 by the City of Philadelphia; Peebles said he was "puzzled" by Philadelphia's decision to cancel the agreement, despite years of delays, a lack of construction, and ballooning costs.

5th & I, Washington D.C.

Peebles "walked away" from his proposed development of the SLS Hotel and Residences, a luxury hotel and condominiums in Washington, D.C.’s Mount Vernon Triangle. 

Brooklyn Village, Charlotte, NC (pending, construction start required early 2023)

As of January 2022, Peebles is delayed on a 17-acre development consisting of 12 buildings with a mixture of uses including two hotels, office, apartment and residential condominium buildings in Charlotte, N.C. Mecklenburg County, North Carolina. The project has been named Brooklyn Village.

Peebles is required to break ground and begin construction by March 2023.

Cancelled or rescinded projects 
Due to Peebles reliance on reselling or flipping interests in government properties, Peebles is subject to frequent cancellations of development projects by government agencies.

Broward County Convention Center (Broward County, Florida)

After "four years of wrangling", Peebles failed to break ground on a convention center in Broward County. Peebles would eventually sue Broward County for costs, but Peebles claims were denied by a court.

Aqueduct Casino (Queens, New York)

Peebles was one of the failed bidders at the Aqueduct Casino in New York; Peebles was deemed "unknowingly impotent" by the New York State committee formed to evaluate bids. Later, the New York State Office of the Investigator General would say that Peebles attempted to "fix the bid" with illegal campaign contributions.  

Long Island Community Hospital (Brooklyn, New York)

Peebles bid on the LICH hospital site and failed to come to terms with the RFP proposal submitted; as with many Peebles deals, he alleged the site was environmentally uncertain and SUNY stopped negotiating with Peebles after it was revealed Peebles had engaged in bad faith negotiations.

In a Press Release, SUNY stated:"Unfortunately, several portions of the Peebles proposal have dramatically changed, including the possibility of long delays in the manner and method in which health care will be provided at the site," SUNY spokesman David Doyle said: "Additionally, Peebles is seeking a cost-sharing agreement in which taxpayers would be partially responsible for environmental remediation, which is far outside the scope of the RFP. These deviations from the initial proposal are unacceptable to SUNY from both a health care and business perspective."

1801 Vine Street (Philadelphia, PA)

One of many in a string of cancelled projects, in November 2020, the City of Philadelphia cancelled Peebles contract to acquire the Family Court Building at 1801 Vine Street; the City cited Peebles inability to begin construction after over 7 years of delays, as well as larger economic trends. Peebles had obtained millions of dollars in government grants over the course of 7 years, and was one of several Peebles contracts cancelled by cities due to delays by Peebles. Peebles also lost a project in Miami's Overtown neighborhood and litigated against the City and the subsequent owners; many of Peebles claims were dismissed in 2020.

Overtown Gateway (Miami, FL)

Peebles partnership with Barron Channer to redevelop the Overtown Gateway sites in the Overtown neighborhood of Miami was cancelled by the City of Miami due to Peebles' failure to obtain financing. After losing the project, Peebles sued Swerdlow Group, but his claims were dismissed by the Court.

5th and Eye (Washington, D.C)

Peebles attempt to build a hotel at the District owned site in Washington D.C. was long delayed and failed when the City demanded Peebles provide affordable housing; Peebles attempt to shift the affordable housing element to a separate, vacant site he already owned. D.C. Mayor Browser publicly criticized Peebles attempt to avoid providing affordable housing at the site. Peebles was also sued by his partner on the project: The Walker Group.

"Affirmation Tower" a/k/a Site K (New York, NY)

Peebles released numerous press releases toting his RFP response to a New York State RFP for "Site K" in New York City. Peebles's proposal was one of many received by the State in response to the RFP, however, Peebles appeared to be the only one of the RFP respondents to leak plans, publicly advocate, and give interviews on the RFP.

Peebles RFP response and interviews apparently did not impress interim-Governor Katie Hochul. In December 2021, the State of New York cancelled Peebles' bid to build a skyscraper at Site K in New York, New York. The cancelled project was dubbed "Affirmation Tower" and was set to include the NAACP as a tenant.

Peebles and De Blasio campaign contribution controversy 
In 2016, Peebles was disqualified as a bidder for an RFP for the Long Island Community Hospital for bad faith negotiating, soon after Peebles demanded Mayor Bill DeBlasio return a $20,000 donation. Peebles then detailed the contribution in several media interviews; Mayor DeBlasio admitted that the city was being probed for its involvement in the sale of LICH considering Peebles contribution controversy with Peebles. 

Peebles told DNA info that he had requested a return of a $20,000 contribution which his company made to a PAC formed by NYC Mayor Bill de Blasio. The contribution was to support universal Pre-K for NYC children when he discovered the funds were being used to fund political mailers to advance development projects favored by de Blasio.

Peebles then began publicly stating he would run for Mayor of NYC to challenge De Blasio despite not being a New York resident. Peebles did not file any paperwork to run for Mayor and did not, in fact, run for Mayor of New York City.

Awards
In 2004, Peebles was elected as chairman of the Greater Miami Convention and Visitors Bureau and has been recognized by various organizations for his leadership and innovation. Also in 2004, the Peebles Corporation was recognized by Black Enterprise as "Company of the Year."

He was named “Trailblazer of the Year” by the Metropolitan Black Bar Association in 2016

In 2017, the New York City Mission Society honored Peebles with its “Champions for Children” award.

Politics 
In 1992, Peebles hosted presidential hopeful and Arkansas Governor Bill Clinton in his home for a fundraiser. Peebles served as a member of President Barack Obama's National Finance Committee for the President's 2008 election and 2012 reelection campaign. in May 2008 Peebles hosted then Senator Obama for a campaign fundraiser at The Bath Club and later hosted President Obama at the home he owned in Washington D.C. for a campaign fundraiser on August 8, 2011.

In 2010, Peebles announced that he had considered running to become mayor of Washington, but he decided against a run due to his mother-in-law's illness. Peebles' mother-in-law died later that year. Peebles has publicly considered running for Mayor of Miami and of New York City.

In 2013, Peebles was elected vice chairman of the board of directors of the Congressional Black Caucus Foundation. In July 2015, he was elevated to chairperson of the CBCF's board of directors and re-elected in February 2016, a role he held until February 2017 when he reached his term limit on the board. Peebles was the only non-member of Congress to be elected to the position of Chair of the CBCF.

Peebles' advocacy for minority and women owned businesses, a more business friendly environment, and expansion of Charter Schools raised speculation  that he was a potential candidate to challenge de Blasio for re-election in the 2017 election cycle for the term beginning January 2018, however, Peebles did not enter the race citing wanting to teach his then 22-year-old son, a recent graduate from Columbia University, the real estate business, and to spend time with his 14-year-old daughter during her last four years at home before college.

Peebles Support for Donald J. Trump 

Peebles frequently appeared on Fox News to support President Donald J. Trump. Peebles financially supported Trump and did not hold any fundraisers for candidate Hillary Clinton. Peebles went as far as to call the allegations against President Donald Trump as so minor as they were like "running a stop sign"; on occasions, Peebles said that President Trump would be "good for real estate" and that Peebles expected to profit and develop the FBI headquarters during Trumps presidential tenure. Peebles and his wife, Katrina Peebles, have supported both parties, in various congressional, mayoral, gubernatorial, and presidential candidates over the years. Peebles publicly endorsed President Donld J. Trump's appointment of a Supreme Court nominee and encouraged public support for President Trump's plan to boost female and minority spending. In a shocking statement, Peebles appeared on CNN and said "Trump will help minorities" in 2016. This statement caused significant tensions between Peebles and the NAACP and Black Congressional Caucus, organizations with which Peebles had been closely aligned; The Black Congressional Caucus faced a major backlash after appointing Peebles and Peebles was soon replaced.

Personal life
Peebles moved to Miami, Florida, in 1998 then to Coral Gables in 2001, has homes in Bridgehampton, Coral Gables and New York City, and lives in Coral Gables and New York City with his wife Katrina, whom he married in 1994 She is a former PR executive and model that serves on the Board of Directors of the Peebles Corporation.

Peebles' son, Donahue, is a Columbia University graduate and is currently working as the Senior Associate of Development at The Peebles Corporation, where he is leading the company's Washington, D.C. development efforts, His daughter Chloe is an equestrian competitor and two sport student athlete.

Writing
 The Peebles Principles: Tales and Tactics from an Entrepreneur's Life of Winning Deals, Succeeding in Business, and Creating a Fortune from Scratch. R. Donahue Peebles with J. P. Faber. John Wiley and Sons (2007). .
 The Peebles Path to Real Estate Wealth: How to Make Money in Any Market. R. Donahue Peebles with J. P. Faber. John Wiley and Sons (2008). .

References

External links 
The Peebles Corporation

1961 births
American business writers
American activists
Living people
Real estate and property developers
African-American businesspeople
Writers from Washington, D.C.
African-American non-fiction writers
American real estate businesspeople
21st-century African-American people
20th-century African-American people